Lewis West  was Archdeacon of Carlisle from 1660 until his death in 1667.

West was born in Hunshelf and educated at St John's College, Cambridge. He held incumbencies at  Woolley, Great Salkeld and Addingham.

References

Archdeacons of Carlisle
Alumni of St John's College, Cambridge
17th-century English Anglican priests
1686 deaths
People from the West Riding of Yorkshire (before 1974)